Willy Puchner (born 15 March 1952) is an Austrian photographer, artist, painter and author.

Life 
Puchner was born and grew up in Mistelbach an der Zaya, Lower Austria, where his parents owned a photo studio. In 1967, he moved to Vienna to attend photography classes at the Höhere Graphische Lehr- und Versuchsanstalt (Vienna Federal Training and Research Institute of Graphic Arts). 
After graduation in 1974, he taught photography there for two years. 
Since 1978, Puchner works as a freelance photographer and writer based in Vienna. 
In 1983, he started to study philosophy, history and sociology. Puchner finished his studies in 1988 with a master's degree in philosophy. His thesis was "Über private Fotografie" (On Private Photography). Since 1988, he gave numerous speeches "On Private Photography" at universities, museums and galleries. Beginning in  1989 Puchner works regularly for the Wiener Zeitung (the oldest daily newspaper of the world).

Willy Puchner became famous with his project "Penguins - Traveling the World". For four years he traveled with his penguins Joe and Sally to the sites of his and our yearning: to the sea and into the desert, to New York, Sydney and Paris, Venice, Tokyo, Honolulu, Rome and Cairo, in order to capture them in photos. There they are now connected forever, lost forever. Before the penguins’ eyes the apparently familiar having been illustrated thousands of times, becomes different and new again. 
Freddy Langer, a journalist, wrote about this project in the Frankfurter Allgemeinen Zeitung (FAZ): "He let them pose in front of word famous sights, pretending they were tourists – and he took their photograph (picture, snapshot). So he created the most beautiful photo album regarding traveling of the 20th century: ”The Longings of the Penguins” (FAZ 08/03/2001)

Willy Puchner likes to work with old people, creating the projects "Die 90-jährigen" (At the Age of 90), "Dialog mit dem Alter" (Dialogue with the High Age), "Die 100-jährigen" (At the Age of 100), "Lebensgeschichte und Fotografie" (Oral History and Photography) and "Liebe im Alter" (Love at High Age).

Exhibitions 
 1980 Museum Moderner Kunst (Museum of Modern Art),  Vienna (Austria) 
 1980 Künstlerhaus (House of Artists), N.Ö. Galerie, Vienna (Austria) 
 1982 Museum des 20. Jahrhundert (Museum of the 20th Century), Vienna (Austria) 
 1984 Österreichisches Fotomuseum (Austrian Museum of Photography), Bad Ischl 
 1992 Steirischer Herbst, Graz 
 2001 "On the Road at Home" (Auf Reisen zu Hause), gallery Atrium ed Arte, Vienna
 2005 Stopover New York, gallery Atrium ed Arte, Vienna
 Further exhibitions in Berlin, Bremen, Kleve, Braunschweig, Klagenfurt, Norfolk (Washington, USA), Bombay (India), Beirut (Lebanon) and in the Japanese cities Tokyo, Osaka, Oita, Nagoya and Sapporo

Bibliography 
 Bäume, 1980, (words Henry David Thoreau),  
 Zum Abschied, zur Wiederkehr, 1981 (words  Hermann Hesse),  
 Gestaltung mit Licht, Form und Farbe, 1981,  
 Bilder österreichischer Städte, (words Harald Sterk), 1982,  
 Strahlender Untergang, (words Christoph Ransmayr), 1982,  
 Bilder österreichischer Landschaft, (words Harald Sterk), 1983,  
 Andalusien, (words Walter Haubrich), 1983, 
 Die Wolken der Wüste, 1983 (words Manfred Pichler),  
 Dorf-Bilder, 1983,  
 Zugvögel seit jeher, 1983, (words Erich Hackl),  
 Das Herz des Himmels, 1985, (words Erich Hackl),  
 Die Sehnsucht der Pinguine, 1992,  
 Ich bin ..., 1997,  
 Tagebuch der Natur, 2001,  
 Flughafen. Eine eigene Welt, 2003,  
 Illustriertes Fernweh. Vom Reisen und nach Hause kommen, 2006, 
 Wien. Vergnügen und Melancholie, 2008, 
 Willy Puchners Welt der Farben, 2011, 
 ABC der fabelhaften Prinzessinnen. Nord-Süd Verlag, Zürich 2013, .
 Hans im Glück. Nord-Süd Verlag, Zürich 2014, 
 Unterwegs, mein Schatz! G&G Verlag, Wien 2015,

English editions 
 Joe & Sally: A long way from home, 1993, 
 Penguins - Traveling the World, 1999, 
 A Brief History of the Diplomatic Academy in Vienna, 2008, together with Heinrich Pfusterschmid-Hardtenstein, .[2]
 Vienna. Pleasure and Melancholy, 2008, 
 The ABC of Fabulous Princesses, 2014, 
 The ABC of Fantastic Princes, 2015,

Stamps 
4 stamps out of the book Tagebuch der Natur (diary of nature)

.

Publications in magazines 
Extrablatt, konkret, Stern, GEO, Life (USA), Corriere della Sera (Italy), Marco Polo (Japan), Asahi Camera, (Japan), Universum ( Austria), Falter, Wiener Zeitung

Awards 
 1983 Theodor-Körner-Preis for art
 1988 Theodor-Körner-Preis for social sciences 
 2002 Österreichischer Staatspreis für Kinder- und Jugendliteratur for Tagebuch der Natur 
 2002 Kinderbuchpreis der Stadt Wien for Tagebuch der Natur
2011 Kunstmediator 2011
2012 Österreichischer Staatspreis für Kinder- und Jugendliteratur „Willy Puchners Welt der Farben“
2012 Kinder- und Jugendbuchpreis der Stadt Wien (Illustrationspreis) „Willy Puchners Welt der Farben“

External links 
 Willy Puchner's website
 Fotohof Gallery's database entry on Willy Puchner
 Puchners Farbenlehre in der FAZ
 New York Times Review

1952 births
Austrian photographers
20th-century Austrian painters
Austrian male painters
21st-century Austrian painters
21st-century male artists
Austrian male writers
Living people
20th-century Austrian male artists